Stiphodon birdsong is a species of goby found on the Indonesia islands and Papua New Guinea.
  
This species can reach a length of  SL.

References

birdsong
Taxa named by Ronald E. Watson
Fish described in 1996